Oleg Igorevich Isayenko (born 31 January 2000) is a Russian football player who plays for FC Krasnodar.

Club career
He made his debut in the Russian Professional Football League for FC Krasnodar-2 on 17 March 2018 in a game against FC Biolog-Novokubansk. He made his Russian Football National League debut for Krasnodar-2 on 25 May 2019 in a game against FC Sibir Novosibirsk.

He made his Russian Premier League debut for FC Krasnodar on 9 April 2022 against FC Rubin Kazan.

Career statistics

References

External links
 
 
 

2000 births
Sportspeople from Kaliningrad
Russian people of Ukrainian descent
Living people
Russian footballers
Association football defenders
FC Krasnodar-2 players
FC Krasnodar players
Russian First League players
Russian Second League players
Russian Premier League players